Tove Marika Jansson (9 August 1914 – 27 June 2001) was a Swedish-speaking Finnish author, novelist, painter, illustrator and comic strip author. Brought up by artistic parents, Jansson studied art from 1930 to 1938 in Stockholm, Helsinki and Paris. Her first solo art exhibition was in 1943. At the same time, she was writing short stories and articles for publication, as well as creating the graphics for book covers and other purposes. She continued to work as an artist and a writer for the rest of her life.

Jansson wrote the Moomin books for children, starting in 1945 with The Moomins and the Great Flood. The next two books, Comet in Moominland and Finn Family Moomintroll, published in 1946 and 1948 respectively, were highly successful in sales, adding to sales of the first book. For her work as a children's writer she received the Hans Christian Andersen Medal in 1966. The Moomins also spun off to a comic strip, initially created by Jansson herself, and in 2016 Jansson was included in The Will Eisner Award Hall of Fame.

Starting with the semi-autobiographical  (Sculptor's Daughter) in 1968, Jansson wrote six novels, including the admired  (The Summer Book), and five books of short stories for adults.

Early life 

Tove Jansson was born in Helsinki, in the Grand Duchy of Finland, a part of the Russian Empire at the time. Her family, part of the Swedish-speaking minority of Finland, was an artistic one: her father, Viktor Jansson, was a sculptor, and her mother, Signe Hammarsten-Jansson, was a Swedish-born graphic designer and illustrator. Tove's siblings also became artists: Per Olov Jansson became a photographer and Lars Jansson an author and cartoonist.

She displayed a number of artworks in exhibitions during the 1930s and early 1940s, and her first solo exhibition was held in 1943.

At age 14, Jansson wrote and illustrated her first picture book  (Sara and Pelle and Neptune's Children). It was not published until 1933. She also sold drawings that were published in magazines in the 1920s.

During the 1930s Jansson made several trips to other European countries. She drew from these for her short stories and articles, which she also illustrated, and which were also published in magazines, periodicals and daily papers. During this period, Jansson also designed many book covers, adverts and postcards.

She was briefly engaged in the 1940s to Atos Wirtanen. During her later studies, Jansson met her future partner Tuulikki Pietilä. The two women collaborated on many works and projects, including a model of the Moominhouse, in collaboration with Pentti Eistola. This is now exhibited at the Moomin museum in Tampere.

Work

Moomins

Jansson is principally known as the author of the Moomin books. Jansson created the Moomins, a family of trolls who are white, round and smooth in appearance, with large snouts that make them vaguely resemble hippopotamuses.

The first Moomin book, The Moomins and the Great Flood, was written in 1945. Although the primary characters are Moominmamma and Moomintroll, most of the principal characters of later stories were only introduced in the next book, so The Moomins and the Great Flood is frequently considered a forerunner to the main series. The book was not a success, but the next two installments in the Moomin series, Comet in Moominland (1946) and Finn Family Moomintroll (1948), brought Jansson some fame. The original title of Finn Family Moomintroll, translates as The Magician's Hat.

The style of the Moomin books changed as time went by. The first books, written starting just after the Second World War, up to Moominland Midwinter (1957), are adventure stories that include floods, comets and supernatural events. The Moomins and the Great Flood deals with Moominmamma and Moomintroll's flight through a dark and scary forest, where they encounter various dangers. In Comet in Moominland, a comet nearly destroys the Moominvalley (some critics have considered this an allegory of nuclear weapons). Finn Family Moomintroll deals with adventures brought on by the discovery of a magician's hat. The Exploits of Moominpappa (1950) tells the story of Moominpappa's adventurous youth and cheerfully parodies the genre of memoir. Finally, Moominsummer Madness (1955) pokes fun at the world of the theatre: the Moomins explore an empty theatre and perform Moominpappa's pompous hexametric melodrama.

In addition to the Moomin novels and short stories, Tove Jansson also wrote and illustrated four original and popular picture books: The Book about Moomin, Mymble and Little My (1952), Who will Comfort Toffle? (1960), The Dangerous Journey (1977) and An Unwanted Guest (1980). As the Moomins' fame grew, two of the original novels, Comet in Moominland and The Exploits of Moominpappa, were revised by Jansson and republished.

Critics have interpreted various Moomin characters as being inspired by her teachers family, especially members of a homeless family, and Jansson spoke in interviews about the backgrounds of, and possible models for, her characters.

Pietilä's personality inspired the character Too-Ticky in Moominland Midwinter and Moomintroll and Little My have been seen as psychological self-portraits of the artist. Jansson referred to Moomintroll as her alter-ego.

The Moomins, generally speaking, relate strongly to Jansson's own family – they were bohemian and lived close to nature. Jansson remained close to her mother until her mother's death in 1970; even after Tove had become an adult, the two often traveled together, and during her final years Signe also lived with Tove part-time. Moominpappa and Moominmamma are often seen as portraits of Jansson's parents.

Other writing 
After Moominvalley in November Tove Jansson stopped writing about Moomins and started writing for adults. After that, she wrote five more novels, including  (The Summer Book) and five collections of short stories. The Summer Book is the best known of her adult fiction translated into English. It is a work of charm, subtlety and simplicity, describing the summer stay on an island of a young girl and her grandmother. The girl is modelled on her niece, Sophia Jansson; the girl's father on Sophia's father, Lars Jansson; and the grandmother on Tove's mother Signe.

Wartime satire in Garm magazine

Tove Jansson worked as an illustrator and cartoonist for the Swedish-language satirical magazine Garm from the 1930s to 1953. One of her political cartoons achieved a brief international fame: she drew Adolf Hitler as a crying baby in diapers, surrounded by Neville Chamberlain and other great European leaders, who tried to calm the baby down by giving it slices of cake – Austria, Poland, Czechoslovakia, etc. In the Second World War, during which Finland fought against the Soviet Union, part of the time cooperating with Nazi Germany, her cover illustrations for Garm lampooned both Hitler and Joseph Stalin: in one, Stalin draws his sword from his impressively long scabbard, only to find it absurdly short; in another, multiple Hitlers ransack a house, carrying away food and artworks. In The Spectators view, Jansson made Hitler a preposterous little figure, self-important and comic.

Comic strip artist 

Jansson also produced illustrations during this period for the Christmas magazines  and Lucifer (just as her mother had earlier) as well as several smaller productions.

The figure of the Moomintroll appeared first in Jansson's political cartoons, where it was used as a signature character near the artist's name. This "Proto-Moomin", then called Snork or Niisku, was thin and ugly, with a long, narrow nose and devilish tail. Jansson said that she had designed the Moomins in her youth: after she lost a philosophical quarrel about Immanuel Kant with one of her brothers, she drew "the ugliest creature imaginable" on the wall of their outhouse and wrote under it "Kant". This Moomin later gained weight and a more pleasant appearance, but in the first Moomin book The Moomins and the Great Flood (originally ), the Immanuel-Kant-Moomin is still perceptible. The name Moomin comes from Tove Jansson's uncle, Einar Hammarsten: when she was studying in Stockholm and living with her Swedish relatives, her uncle tried to stop her pilfering food by telling her that a "Moomintroll" lived in the kitchen closet and breathed cold air down people's necks.
in
In 1952, after Comet in Moominland and Finn Family Moomintroll had been translated into English, a British publisher asked if Tove Jansson would be interested in drawing comic strips about the Moomins. Jansson had already drawn a long Moomin comic adventure,  (Moomintroll and the End of the World), based loosely on Comet in Moominland, for the Swedish-language newspaper , and she accepted the offer. The comic strip Moomintroll, started in 1954 in the London Evening News. Tove Jansson drew 21 long Moomin stories from 1954 to 1959, writing them at first by herself and then with her brother Lars Jansson. She eventually gave the strip up because the daily work of a comic artist did not leave her time to write books and paint, but Lars took over the strip and continued it until 1975.

The series was published in book form in Swedish; books 1 to 6 have been published in English, Moomin: The Complete Tove Jansson Comic Strip.

Painter and illustrator 
Although she became known first and foremost as an author, Tove Jansson considered her careers as author and painter to be of equal importance. She painted her whole life, changing style from the classical impressionism of her youth to the highly abstract modernist style of her later years. Jansson displayed a number of artworks in exhibitions during the 1930s and early 1940s, and her first solo exhibition was held in 1943. Despite generally positive reviews, criticism induced Jansson to refine her style such that in her 1955 solo exhibition her style had become less overloaded in terms of detail and content. Between 1960 and 1970 Jansson held five more solo exhibitions.

Jansson also created a series of commissioned murals and public works throughout her career, which may still be viewed in their original locations. These works of Jansson's included:
 The Aurora Children's Hospital in Helsinki
 The  restaurant of Helsinki City Hall – Transferred in 1974 to Helsinki Swedish-language Adult Education Centre "Workers' Institute" Arbis and in 2016 to a permanent Jansson exhibition at Helsinki Art Museum
 The  hotel at Hamina
 The Wise and Foolish Virgins altarpiece in Teuva Church (1954)
 A number of fairy-tale murals in schools and kindergartens including the kindergarten in Pori (1984)

In addition to providing the illustrations for her own Moomin books, Jansson also illustrated Swedish translations of classics such as J. R. R. Tolkien's The Hobbit and Lewis Carroll's The Hunting of the Snark and Alice's Adventures in Wonderland (some used later in Finnish translations as well). She also illustrated her late work, The Summer Book (1972).

Theatre 
Several stage productions have been made from Jansson's Moomin series, including a number that Jansson herself was involved in.

The earliest production was a 1949 theatrical version of Comet in Moominland performed at Åbo Svenska Teater.

In the early 1950s, Jansson collaborated on Moomin-themed children's plays with Vivica Bandler. In 1952, Jansson designed stage settings and dresses for Pessi and Illusia, a ballet by Ahti Sonninen which was performed at the Finnish National Opera. By 1958, Jansson began to become directly involved in theater as Lilla Teater produced  (Troll in the wings), a play with lyrics by Jansson and music composed by Erna Tauro. The production was a success, and later performances were held in Sweden and Norway.

In 1974 the first Moomin opera was produced, with music composed by Ilkka Kuusisto.

Personal life 

Jansson had several male lovers, including the political philosopher Atos Wirtanen, who was the inspiration for the Moomin character Snufkin. However, she eventually "went over to the spook side" as she put it—a coded expression for homosexuality—and developed a secret love affair with the married theater director Vivica Bandler.

In 1956 Jansson met her lifelong partner,  – or "Tooti", as she was known. In Helsinki they lived separately, in neighbouring blocks, visiting each other privately through an attic passageway. In the 1960s, they built a house on a tiny uninhabited island in the Gulf of Finland,  from Helsinki, where they would escape for the summer months. Jansson's and Pietilä's travels and summers spent together on the Klovharu island in Pellinki have been captured on several hours of film, shot by Pietilä. It is speculated that the character Too-ticky, a wise human who wears a red striped shirt and carries a briefcase, was inspired by Pietilä.

Jansson died on 27 June 2001 at the age of 86 from cancer and is buried with her parents and younger brother Lars, at the Hietaniemi Cemetery in Helsinki.

Family
 Viktor Jansson (born 1829) married Ida Maria Lemström (born 1842)
 Julius Viktor Jansson (1862–1892) married Johanna Theresia Karlsson (1864–1938)
 Viktor Bernhard Jansson (1886–1958) married Signe Hammarsten (1882–1970)
 Tove Marika Jansson (1914–2001), intimate partnership with Tuulikki "Tooti" Pietilä (1956–until death)
 Per Olov Jansson (1920–2019)
 Lars Jansson (1926–2000)
 Vivica Sophia Jansson (born 1962) married __ Zambra
 James Zambra (born 1989)
 Thomas Zambra (born 1992)
 Julius Edvard Jansson (born 1887) married Toini Maria Ilmonen

Cultural legacy 
The biennial Hans Christian Andersen Award conferred by the International Board on Books for Young People is the highest recognition available to a writer or illustrator of children's books. Jansson received the writing award in 1966.

In 1968, Swedish public TV, SVT, made a documentary about Tove called Moomins and the Harbor (39 min.).

Jansson's books, originally written in Swedish, have been translated into 45 languages.

The Moomin Museum in Tampere displays much of Jansson's work on the Moomins.

Tove Jansson was selected as the main motif in the 2004 minting of a Finnish commemorative coin, the €10 Tove Jansson and Finnish Children's Culture commemorative coin. The obverse depicts a combination of Tove Jansson portrait with several objects: the skyline, an artist's palette, a crescent and a sailing boat. The reverse design features three Moomin characters. In 2014 she was again featured on a commemorative coin, minted at €10 and €20 values, being the only person other than the former Finnish president  to be granted two such coins. She was also featured on a €2 commemorative coin that entered general circulation in June 2014.

Since 1988, Finland's Post has released several postage stamp sets and one postal card with Moomin motifs. In 2014, Jansson herself was featured on a Finnish stamp set.

The park is located near Jansson's childhood home.

In March 2014, the Ateneum Art Museum opened a major centenary exhibition showcasing Jansson's works as an artist, an illustrator, a political caricaturist and the creator of the Moomins. The exhibition drew nearly 300,000 visitors in six months. After Helsinki the exhibition embarked on a tour in Japan to visit five Japanese museums.

In 2012, the BBC broadcast a one-hour documentary on Jansson, Moominland Tales: The Life of Tove Jansson.

From October 2017 to January 2018, the Dulwich Picture Gallery held an exhibition of Jansson's paintings, illustrations, and cartoons. This was the first major retrospective exhibition of her work in the United Kingdom.

With a new animated series, Moominvalley broadcast in 2019, Rhianna Pratchett wrote an article about the impact Tove Jansson had had on her father Sir Terry Pratchett; he called Jansson one of the greatest children's writers there has ever been and credited her writing as one of the reasons he became an author.

A biopic, titled Tove, directed by Zaida Bergroth was released in October 2020.

Bibliography

The Moomin books

Novels 
  (1945, The Moomins and the Great Flood)
  (1946, Comet in Moominland)
  (1968; reworked edition of Comet in Moominland)
  (1948, Finn Family Moomintroll; in some editions The Happy Moomins)
  (1950, The Exploits of Moominpappa)
  (1968, The Memoirs of Moominpappa; reworked edition of The Exploits of Moominpappa)
  (1954, Moominsummer Madness)
  (1957, Moominland Midwinter)
  (1965, Moominpappa at Sea)
  (1970, Moominvalley in November)

Short story collections 
  (1962, Tales from Moominvalley)

Picture books 
  (1952, The Book about Moomin, Mymble and Little My)
  (1960, Who Will Comfort Toffle?)
  (1977, The Dangerous Journey)
  (1980, Villain in the Moominhouse)
  (1993, Songs From Moominvalley; songbook. With Lars Jansson and Erna Tauro)

Comic strips 
 , Books 1–7 (1977–1981, Moomin; Books 3–7 with Lars Jansson) (Books 1–6 released in English).

Other books

Novels 
  (1972, The Summer Book)
  (1974, Sun City)
  (1982, The True Deceiver)
  (1984, The Field of Stones)
  (1989, Fair Play)

Short story collections 
  (1968, Sculptor's Daughter) (semi-autobiographical)
  (1971, The Listener)
  (1978, Art in Nature)
  (1987, Travelling Light)
  (1991, Letters from Klara and Other Stories)
  (1998 compilation, Messages. Selected stories 1971–1997)
 A Winter Book (2006 compilation)

Miscellaneous 
  (under the pseudonym of Vera Haij, 1933, Sara and Pelle and the Octopuses of the Water Sprite)
  (1993, Notes from an Island; autobiography; illustrated by Tuulikki Pietilä)
  (2019) (personal letters written by Tove, edited by Boel Westin and Helen Svensson)

Awards 
 Hans Christian Andersen Award (gold medal, 1966)
 Award for State Literature (1963, 1971 and 1982)
 Swedish Academy Finland Prize (1972)
 Order of the Smile (1975)
 Pro Finlandia Medal (1976)
 Swedish Culture Foundation Honorary Award (1983)
 The Finnish Cultural Award (1990)
 Selma Lagerlöf Prize (1992)
 The Finland Art Prize (1993)
  (1994)
 The Swedish Academy Award (1994)
 The American-Scandinavian Foundation Honorary Cultural Award (1996)
 WSOY Literary Foundation Award (1999)

See also

Notes

References

Further reading

External links 

 Tove Jansson at www.moomin.com 
 Tove Jansson at Schildts 
 Tove Jansson and the altarpiece "Ten Virgins" 
 Tove Jansson at WSOY 
 thisisFINLAND: People – Tove Jansson: writer, painter and illustrator
 The Moomin Trove Comprehensive lists of Tove Jansson's Moomin books
 Tove Jansson and The Moomin Trove by Finland Travel Club
 Moominland Tales: The Life of Tove Jansson (BBC) by Eleanor Yule
 
 
 Jansson, Tove (1914–2001) at National Biography of Finland
 

1914 births
2001 deaths
 
Writers from Helsinki
People from Uusimaa Province (Grand Duchy of Finland)
Finnish writers in Swedish
Writers from Uusimaa
Finnish comic strip cartoonists
Finnish cartoonists
Finnish children's writers
Finnish comics artists
Finnish fantasy writers
Finnish women illustrators
Finnish women short story writers
Finnish short story writers
Finnish women novelists
Finnish people of Swedish descent
Konstfack alumni
Bisexual novelists
Bisexual artists
LGBT comics creators
Finnish LGBT novelists
Moomins
Tolkien artists
Finnish female comics artists
Female comics writers
Writers who illustrated their own writing
Hans Christian Andersen Award for Writing winners
Selma Lagerlöf Prize winners
Finnish children's book illustrators
Women science fiction and fantasy writers
Finnish women children's writers
Swedish-speaking Finns
20th-century Finnish novelists
20th-century Finnish women writers
20th-century Finnish women artists
Artists from Helsinki
20th-century short story writers
Burials at Hietaniemi Cemetery
Finnish painters
Modern painters
Deaths from cancer in Finland
Finnish LGBT painters
Finnish bisexual people